Government Girls Inter College, Dildar Nagar in Dildarnagar, Uttar Pradesh, India, is situated in the middle of the town.

References

External links

Intermediate colleges in Uttar Pradesh
Girls' schools in Uttar Pradesh
Education in Ghazipur district
Dildarnagar
Educational institutions established in 2008
2008 establishments in Uttar Pradesh